Claude Papesch was a blind multi-instrumentalist from New Zealand. He played with many New Zealand outfits as well as well known Australian blues groups, Chain and Savage Rose. He also was a solo artist and released recordings of his own. He has an important place in New Zealand rock & roll history.

Background
Papesch was originally from New Plymouth. He moved to Auckland when he was young.

Career

New Zealand
In the late 1950s, he was a member of Johnny Devlin's band Johnny Devlin & the Devils. He played both piano and saxophone while the group.
In 1964, he was the musical director for two of New Zealand's major record companies. Also in that year, he wrote a song for Wellington singer Maurice Cook which was recorded with an orchestral backing. He had multiple roles in the recording session as arranger the, directing the recording session, playing the piano and adding his vocal backing.
In 1966, it was reported in the edition of 7 May of The New Zealand Herald that he was the head tutor of the New Zealand College of Entertainers in Auckland. He was also its founder.

Australia
Papesch came over to Australia with Tim Piper and they both played in an early formation of Chain.  His keyboard playing was evident on the B side of a Chain single, "Mr. Time". He was with the group from August to October 1969. Then Papesch along with Ace Follington and Tim Piper left Chain to form Savage Rose.

In 1973 his album Hammond Spectacular was released on His Master's Voice SOEX-10021. The following year Hammond Electrique was also released. Lyn Barnett helped with backing vocals on Hammond Electrique.

Politics
He was elected Deputy Mayor of the Blue Mountains City Council in 1984. He also represented the Blue Mountains, Lithgow and Rylstone districts. Due to illness, he left his public position. He was also an active member of the Labor Party.

Death
Papesch died on 2 February 1987 at age 45. He was survived by his partner, son, and daughter.

Discography

References

External links
 Audio Culture" Claude Papesch
 Sergent.com.au" Claude Papesch
 Milesago: Claude Papesch
 Discogs: Claude Papesch

Blind musicians
New Zealand jazz pianists
20th-century pianists
New Zealand organists
Male organists
New South Wales politicians
1987 deaths
Year of birth missing
20th-century male musicians
Male jazz musicians
Chain (band) members
New Zealand expatriates in Australia